Kyle Pettey is a Paralympian athlete from Canada competing mainly in category F35 shot put events.

In the 2000 Summer Paralympics Kyle competed in the F35 javelin and won silver medals in the F35 discus and shot put.  Four years later competing in the F35 shot and discus he failed to win any medals but in 2008 he won the bronze in the F33-34/52 shot put.

External links
 

Paralympic track and field athletes of Canada
Athletes (track and field) at the 2000 Summer Paralympics
Athletes (track and field) at the 2008 Summer Paralympics
Paralympic silver medalists for Canada
Paralympic bronze medalists for Canada
Living people
Medalists at the 2000 Summer Paralympics
Medalists at the 2008 Summer Paralympics
Commonwealth Games medallists in athletics
Commonwealth Games gold medallists for Canada
Year of birth missing (living people)
Athletes (track and field) at the 2010 Commonwealth Games
Paralympic medalists in athletics (track and field)
Medalists at the 2007 Parapan American Games
Medalists at the 2015 Parapan American Games
Canadian male shot putters
20th-century Canadian people
21st-century Canadian people
Medallists at the 2010 Commonwealth Games